Stop the Dominoes is an album by Mark Heard, released in 1981 on Home Sweet Home Records.

Track listing 
All songs written by Mark Heard.

Side one
 "One Of the Dominoes" - 3:11
 "Stranded At the Station" - 3:54
 "You Could Lie To Me" - 2:55
 "One Night Stand" - 3:31
 "I'm Crying Again" - 4:43

Side two
 "Stuck In the Middle" - 3:13
 "Call Me the Fool" - 3:28
 "I'm In Chains" - 4:39
 "Lonely One" - 3:37
 "To See Your Face" - 4:26

Personnel 
The band
Mark Heard - electric guitars, electric lead and slide guitars, keyboards
Keith Edwards - drums
John Patitucci - bass guitar
Tom Howard - keyboards
Tony Eisenbarger - electric guitars 
Alex MacDougall - percussion
Mark Heard, Larry Norman, Randy Stonehill, Leslie Phillips, Little Bobby Emmons, Dave de Coup Crank - backing vocals

Additional musicians
Sonny Garrish - pedal steel guitar
Buddy Spicher - fiddle
Karl Denson - saxophone

Production
Produced, written and arranged by Mark Heard
Primary engineer: Jonathan David Brown
Additional engineers: Mark Heard, Janet Sue Heard
Recorded February–March, 1981 at Poiema Studios, Camarillo, California and at The Gold Mine, Los Angeles, California
Mixed by Mark Heard at The Gold Mine, Nashville, Tennessee
Album design by Mark Heard
Photographs by Janet Sue Heard
Graphics director: Dave de Coup Crank

"Special thanks to Jonathan, Tammy and Nathan for tacos and locos, to Larry and Randy for awesome rockolla, to Bill and Marsha for homestead and avocado fans, to Chris and Shanon for talking Southern, to Leo Fender for Stratification, to David and Christy for Monday nights, to Dave for A and B bath, stop and hypo."

"Love to the Circle of Cynics. to Jean-Daniel und Hansruedi in Zürich, to Freddie in London, to John and Prisca and the Huemoz folks, to Mita Perefit and Sandra, to the Russell Hall Stairwell Dreamers and to my folks. Additional Thanks to Bill Deaton."

Personnel 
The band
 Mark Heard – electric guitars, electric lead and slide guitars, keyboards, backing vocals
 Keith Edwards – drums
 John Patitucci – bass guitar
 Tom Howard – keyboards
 Tony Eisenbarger – electric guitars 
 Alex MacDougall – percussion
 Larry Norman – backing vocals
 Randy Stonehill – backing vocals
 Leslie Phillips – backing vocals
 Little Bobby Emmons – backing vocals
 Dave de Coup Crank – backing vocals

Additional musicians
Sonny Garrish – pedal steel guitar
Buddy Spicher – fiddle
Karl Denson – saxophone

Production
 Mark Heard – producer, additional engineer, arranging, album design, mixing at The Gold Mine, Nashville, Tennessee
 Jonathan David Brown – primary engineer
 Janet Sue Heard – additional engineer, photography
 Recorded February–March, 1981 at Poiema Studios, Camarillo, California and at The Gold Mine, Los Angeles, California
 Dave de Coup Crank – graphics director

References

1981 albums
Mark Heard albums